Vânători is a commune located in Vrancea County, Western Moldavia, Romania. It is composed of seven villages: Balta Raței, Jorăști, Mirceștii Noi, Mirceștii Vechi, Petrești, Rădulești and Vânători.

References

Communes in Vrancea County
Localities in Western Moldavia